MD 600 may refer to:

MD Helicopters MD 600
Maryland Route 600